Missionaries in Darkest Africa is a 1912 American silent film produced by Kalem Company and distributed by General Film Company. It was directed by Sidney Olcott with Gene Gauntier, Jack J. Clark and Robert Vignola in the leading roles.

Cast
 Gene Gauntier - Faith
 Jack J. Clark - The Chief
 Robert Vignola - Reverend Elbert Lawrence

Production notes
The film was shot in Luxor, Egypt.

External links

 Missionaries in Darkest Africa website dedicated to Sidney Olcott

1912 films
American silent short films
Films set in Egypt
Films shot in Egypt
Films directed by Sidney Olcott
1912 adventure films
American black-and-white films
American adventure films
1910s American films
Silent adventure films